Leigh Court railway station was a station in Leigh, Worcestershire, England. The station was opened on 2 May 1874 and closed on 7 September 1964.

References

Sources

Further reading

Disused railway stations in Worcestershire
Railway stations in Great Britain opened in 1874
Railway stations in Great Britain closed in 1964
Former Great Western Railway stations
Beeching closures in England